This is the discography of Electric Wizard.

Studio albums

Extended plays

Compilation albums

Singles
 "I Am Nothing" (2014)
 "Sadiowitch" (2014)
 "See You in Hell" (2017)
 "Wicked Caresses" (2017)
 "L.S.D" (2021)

References

Discographies of British artists
Heavy metal group discographies